The women's 150m individual medley events at the 2022 World Para Swimming Championships were held at the Penteada Olympic Swimming Complex in Madeira between 12–18 June.

Medalists

Results

SM3
Final
Six swimmers from five nations took part.

References

2022 World Para Swimming Championships
2022 in women's swimming